Toiano is a village in Tuscany, central Italy, administratively a frazione of the comune of Vinci, Metropolitan City of Florence. At the time of the 2001 census its population was 213.

Toiano is about 43 km from Florence and 2 km from Vinci.

References 

Frazioni of the Province of Florence